Alberto Arenas de Mesa (born 5 October 1965) is a Chilean economist, academic, and Socialist politician. He was Chile's Minister of Finance, under the second government of President Michelle Bachelet (2014–2015).

He was a part of the team of academics who published a paper on the Chilean Pension Reform, in August 2006.

References

Government ministers of Chile
1965 births
20th-century Chilean economists
Chilean academics
Living people
Chilean Ministers of Finance
University of Chile alumni
University of Pittsburgh alumni
21st-century Chilean economists